Robert Field (1769–1819) was a painter who was born in London and died in Kingston, Jamaica.  According to art historian Daphne Foskett, author of A Dictionary of British Miniature Painters (1972), Field was "one of the best American miniaturists of his time." During Field's time in Nova Scotia at the beginning of the nineteenth century, he was the most professionally trained painter in present-day Canada.  He worked in the conventional neo-classic portrait style of Henry Raeburn and Gilbert Stuart.  His most famous works are two groups of miniatures of George Washington, commissioned by his wife Martha Washington. (Field's miniatures of both are in the Yale University Art Gallery permanent collection.)

America 
He received his early training at Royal Academy schools in London in 1790. In 1794, he moved to the United States, where he took up residence in Philadelphia, the nation's first capital. In Philadelphia, Field immediately joined a group of artists led by Charles Willson Peale in establishing the Columbianum, or American Academy of the Fine Arts, which was eventually superseded by the Pennsylvania Academy of the Fine Arts in 1805.

Field spent 14 years in the U.S., working as a miniature painter in Baltimore, Philadelphia, Washington, D.C., and Boston. During this period, he produced miniatures of George and Martha Washington, Thomas Jefferson, and a wide range of people prominent in the social, economic, and political life of American society.  According to historian Harry Piers, Field was one of the four most highly sought American miniaturists in his time. Martha Washington herself commissioned Field in 1800 to paint a group of miniature as mementoes for friends and family, to commemorate the revered General and President on the one-year anniversary of his death. Two groups of miniatures of George Washington were produced by Field at Martha's request in late 1800, the first group showing him in civilian dress, the second as general in full uniform.

Nova Scotia 
When tensions between America and England started to rise in the lead up to the War of 1812, Field  remained a loyalist and moved from Boston to Halifax, Nova Scotia (1808). He served in the 1st Company of Halifax Volunteer Artillery in 1812. He became a member of the Charitable Irish Society of Halifax.

He continued to produce miniatures, but he also painted more than 50 oil portraits of government officials, military officers, merchants, and assorted members of the Halifax "gentility"; among his subjects were Bishop Charles Inglis, former lieutenant governor Sir John Wentworth, Sir George Prevost, Sir John Coape Sherbrooke, Admiral of the Fleet Sir Provo William Parry Wallis, and Sir Alexander Forrester Inglis Cochrane, vice-admiral in the Royal Navy (whose portrait was shown at the Royal Academy exhibition in London in 1810).

Jamaica 
In 1816 he moved to Jamaica, settling first in Montego Bay and then in Kingston. He died on 9 August 1819, apparently of yellow fever, and was buried in an unmarked grave in the old "West Ground" cemetery, now called the Strangers' Burial Ground, near the Kingston parish church.

Gallery

Other works

References

Sources
 Robert Field, Art Gallery of Nova Scotia 1978
 Harry Piers. Artists of Nova Scotia. Nova Scotia Historical Society. 1914. p. 112- 119
 Early American portrait painters in miniature by Theodore Bolton. New York. 1921 -  Robert Field
 Piers, Harry, Robert Field: Portrait Painter in Oils, Miniature and Water-Colours and Engraver, New York, 1927.

External links

 Works by Robert Field
 Portrait by Robert Field

1769 births
1819 deaths
18th-century American painters
18th-century American male artists
American male painters
19th-century American painters
Canadian painters
Artists from Nova Scotia
19th-century American male artists